Nathan James Lindsay (May 24, 1936 – May 25, 2015) was a major general in the United States Air Force and a former astronaut. He worked on the Titan III and the Air Force Satellite Control Network.

Early years
Lindsay was born in Monroe, Wisconsin, and earned both a bachelor of science degree and a master of science degree in mechanical engineering from the University of Wisconsin–Madison. He then earned a master of science degree in systems management from the University of Southern California.

Military career
While studying at the University of Wisconsin–Madison, Lindsay earned his commission through the Air Force Reserve Officer Training Corps. He joined the Air Force in 1959, and in 1980 he was named director of operations support and interrogations in the Space Systems Division and in 1982 he was named assistant deputy commander for space operations. Lindsay worked on the Titan III and the Air Force Satellite Control Network. In 1987 he became Director of Special Projects in the Office of the Secretary of the Air Force, and was promoted to Major General in 1988. Lindsay retired from the Air Force effective January 1, 1993.

Lindsay died on May 25, 2015, one day after his 79th birthday.

Awards
Awards he has received include the Defense Superior Service Medal, the Legion of Merit with oak leaf cluster, the Meritorious Service Medal with oak leaf cluster, the Joint Service Commendation Medal, the Air Force Commendation Medal with oak leaf cluster, the Master Astronaut Badge, and the Master Missile Badge.

References

1936 births
2015 deaths
American astronauts
Military personnel from Wisconsin
People from Monroe, Wisconsin
Recipients of the Defense Superior Service Medal
Recipients of the Legion of Merit
United States Air Force generals
University of Wisconsin–Madison College of Engineering alumni
USC Viterbi School of Engineering alumni